Margaret Ann "Peggy" Knudsen (April 22, 1923 – July 11, 1980) was an American character actress.

Early life
She was born Margaret Ann Knudsen in Duluth, Minnesota. Her father was Conrad Knudsen, Duluth's fire chief. Her ancestors were Irish and Norwegian.

Career

Stage 
Knudsen made her Broadway debut in My Sister Eileen (1940). She replaced Jo Ann Sayers, who had originated the role of a girl who couldn't decide whether to be an actress or get married. Finding herself in that situation in real life, Sayers married a naval officer. The show's producer saw Knudsen working in a stage door canteen and chose her to take over the role.

Film 
Knudsen began her film career in 1946 in A Stolen Life opposite Bette Davis. (In a February 15, 1948, newspaper column, entertainment writer Louella Parsons quoted Knudsen saying, "My first picture was Shadow of a Woman with Helmut Dantine. I played his ex-wife."   That same year, she appeared in bit parts in several films including The Big Sleep and Humoresque with Joan Crawford.

In 1948, Knudsen ventured into a different genre of film, doing comedy instead of drama and leaving Warner Bros. to do freelance work. She also took vocal lessons from Kay Thompson.

Despite appearing in big budget features with established stars, Knudsen's career never took off and she was relegated to smaller roles in B movies. Her last film role was in the 1957 film Istanbul with Errol Flynn.

Radio 
Knudsen played Lois Graves in the radio version of Junior Miss, Karen Adams in Woman in White. and Phillipa on The Bill Goodwin Show.

Television 
Knudsen played April Adams in the comedy So This Is Hollywood on NBC (1955). She also had roles in pilots for two programs – Do Not Disturb and Howie – that did not develop into series.

In the 1950s and 1960s, Knudsen appeared in guest-starring roles on several television shows. She made two guest appearances on Perry Mason in 1958–1959; one as Sheila Bowers in "The Case of the Gilded Lily," and Marie Chapman in "The Case of the Spurious Sister." Other television appearances included Alfred Hitchcock Presents, The Millionaire, Tombstone Territory, The Life and Legend of Wyatt Earp (as 'Kansas Lily'), Pete and Gladys and three times on Bat Masterson (as "Louisa Carey" in 1959, as "Katie" in 1960 and as "Lottie Tremaine" in 1961). After appearing in an episode of The Adventures of Ozzie & Harriet in 1965, Knudsen retired from acting.

Personal life and death 
Knudsen's first marriage was to Adrian Samish, a radio executive. The two eloped after Knudsen's June 1942 performance in My Sister Eileen and went to Media, Pennsylvania, to marry. They divorced in 1946. On June 15, 1949, Knudsen married Jim Jordan Jr. in Los Angeles.  They had three daughters together. Jordan was the son of Jim and Marian Jordan, better known as Fibber McGee and Molly. The couple divorced in 1960. On February 12, 1962, Knudsen married Francis S. Kellstrom, an electrical contractor. They separated that July and were divorced October 22, 1962.

She suffered from crippling arthritis for most of her later years and was cared for by her close friend, actress Jennifer Jones. Her grandson is the Hollywood screenwriter John Orloff.

On July 11, 1980, Knudsen died of cancer in Encino, California.

Recognition 
For her contribution to the television industry, Knudsen has a star on the Hollywood Walk of Fame at 6262 Hollywood Boulevard.

Filmography

 A Stolen Life (1946) - Diedre
 Two Guys from Milwaukee (1946) - Juke-Box Voice (voice, uncredited)
 The Big Sleep (1946) - Mona Mars
 Shadow of a Woman (1946) - Louise Ryder
 Never Say Goodbye (1946) - Nancy Graham
 Humoresque (1946) - Florence Boray
 The Unfaithful (1947) - Claire
 Stallion Road (1947) - Daisy Otis
 Roses Are Red (1947) - Martha McCormack
 My Wild Irish Rose (1947) - Eileen - Leading Lady (uncredited)
 Perilous Waters (1948) - Pat Ferris
 Half Past Midnight (1948) - Sally Ferris, alias Sally Parker
 Trouble Preferred (1948) - Dale Kent
 Copper Canyon (1950) - Cora
 Unchained (1955) - Elaine
 Betrayed Women (1955) - Nora Collins
 Good Morning, Miss Dove (1955) - Billie Jean Green
 The Bottom of the Bottle (1956) - Ellen Miller
 Hilda Crane (1956) - Nell Bromley
 Istanbul (1957) - Marge Boyle

Television

 Your Show Time (1 episode, 1949)
 Racket Squad (1 episode, 1951) - Julie
 Mr. and Mrs. North (2 episodes, 1953) - Elsie Dargon / Sally Kovack
 The Pepsi-Cola Playhouse (1 episode, 1954)
 City Detective (1 episode, 1955) - Denise
 The Loretta Young Show (1 episode, 1955) - Madeleine
 So This is Hollywood (Unknown episodes, 1955) - April Adams
 Alfred Hitchcock Presents (1 episode, 1956) - Herta Cowell
 The Millionaire (1 episode, 1956) - Irene Borden
 The Gale Storm Show (1 episode, 1956) - Flo
 Panic! (1 episode, 1957) - Kit Dutton
 The Joseph Cotten Show (1 episode, 1957) - Mona
 The Ford Television Theatre (1 episode, 1957) - Susan Davenport
 The Thin Man (1 episode, 1957) - Blonde / Sandra Storm
 The Life and Legend of Wyatt Earp (1 episode, 1958) - Lilly Reeve
 The Real McCoys (1 episode, 1958) - Miss Eberle
 Tombstone Territory (1 episode, 1959) - Amy Ward
 Perry Mason (2 episodes, 1958–1959) - Marie Chapman / Sheila Bowers
 Tightrope (1 episode, 1959) - Helen Stevens
 General Electric Theater (1 episode, 1960) - Irene Martin
 Pete and Gladys (1 episode, 1960) - Mrs. Valenti
 Bat Masterson (3 episodes, 1959–1961) - Lottie Tremaine / Katie / Louisa Carey
 The Wonderful World of Disney (1 episode, 1961) - Nellie
 The Adventures of Ozzie and Harriet (3 episodes, 1960–1965) - Mrs. Frazer / Mrs. Kelley / Mrs. Masters (final appearance)

References

External links
 
 
 

1923 births
1980 deaths
20th-century American actresses
American radio actresses
American film actresses
American television actresses
American people of Irish descent
Actresses from Duluth, Minnesota
Deaths from cancer in California
Burials at San Fernando Mission Cemetery